Jennifer Holt (born Elizabeth Marshall Holt; November 10, 1920 – September 21, 1997) was an American actress.

Early years
She was born in Hollywood, California, to actor Jack Holt and his wife, Margaret Woods. She was the sister of western actor Tim Holt.

Her education included schooling at convents in Belgium, Santiago College in Chile, and The Bishop's School in La Jolla, California.

Film
Holt made her film debut using the stage name Jacqueline Holt in a 1941 western starring Hopalong Cassidy. A 1942 newspaper article reported, "Jennifer Holt ... has been signed to a long term contract with Universal." Her film singing debut came in Tenting Tonight on the Old Camp Ground in 1943. She sang Cielito Lindo while portraying an entertainer.

She went on to make 47 films during the 1940s. All but eight of her roles were in western films in which she appeared opposite cowboy stars such as Lash LaRue, Tex Ritter and Johnny Mack Brown.

Although the popularity of western films had faded by the mid-1950s, during the 1970s western film festivals became popular with fans of the genre and she occasionally participated as a guest.

Television
After making her final film in 1949, in 1950 Holt co-hosted a television show called Panhandle Pete and Jennifer which ran for one season. During the remainder of the 1950s she made occasional guest appearances on television western series such as The Gabby Hayes Show and Tales of Wells Fargo starring Dale Robertson.

Recognition
In 1984, she received the Golden Boot Award for her contributions to western cinema.

Personal life
Holt was married numerous times, living for a while in Mexico. She had no children.

The marriages that can be confirmed were:

November 19, 1943, to Marine Major William M. Ritchey in Yuma, Arizona. She sought a divorce after four months, and the divorce was granted on August 4, 1944. 
September 29, 1946, to William Bakewell. She filed suit for divorce from Bakewell on April 23, 1948. The divorce was granted June 10, 1948.
Aylmer Hughes Chamberlain, her last husband, with whom she was living in England at the time of her death in 1997.

Death
Holt was living in Dorset, England in the United Kingdom with her husband, Aylmer Hughes Chamberlain, at the time of her death from cancer at age 76 in 1997.

Partial filmography

Stick to Your Guns (1941) .... June Winters (as Jacqueline Holt)
Broadway (1942) .... TWA stewardess (uncredited)
Private Buckaroo (1942) .... Joyce Mason
The Silver Bullet (1942) .... Nancy Lee
Pardon My Sarong (1942) .... Girl on bus with Tommy (uncredited)
Deep in the Heart of Texas (1942) .... Nan Taylor
Little Joe, the Wrangler (1942) .... Janet Hammond
The Old Chisholm Trail (1942) .... Mary Lee
Tenting Tonight on the Old Camp Ground (1943) .... Kay Randolph
Hi, Buddy (1943) .... Miss Russell
Cheyenne Roundup (1943) .... Ellen Randall
Raiders of San Joaquin (1943) .... Jane Carter
Cowboy in Manhattan (1943) .... Mitzi
Get Going (1943) .... Vilma Walters
Frontier Law (1943) .... Lois Rodgers
Hers to Hold (1943) .... Girl (uncredited)
The Lone Star Trail (1943) .... Joan Winters
Adventures of the Flying Cadets (1943, Serial) .... Andre Mason [Chs. 5-13]
Raiders of Sunset Pass (1943) .... Betty Mathews
Marshal of Gunsmoke (1944) .... Ellen Carey
Oklahoma Raiders (1944) .... Donna Ross, aka El Vengador
Guns of the Law (1944) .... Lillian Wilkins
Outlaw Trail (1944) .... Alice Thornton
Riders of the Santa Fe (1944) .... Carla Anderson
The Navajo Trail (1945) .... Mary Trevor
Under Western Skies (1945) .... Charity
Gun Smoke (1945) .... Jane Condon
Beyond the Pecos (1945) .... Ellen Tanner
Renegades of the Rio Grande (1945) .... Dolores Salezar
Song of Old Wyoming (1945) .... Vicky Conway, adopted
The Lost Trail (1945) .... Jane Burns
Moon Over Montana (1946) .... Gwynn Randal
Hop Harrigan (1946) .... Gail Nolan
 Trigger Fingers (1946) .... Jane Caldwell
Over the Santa Fe Trail (1947) .... Carolyn
Buffalo Bill Rides Again (1947) .... Dale Harrington
Pioneer Justice (1947) .... Betty Walters
Ghost Town Renegades (1947) .... Diane Trent
Stage to Mesa City (1947) .... Margie Watson
The Fighting Vigilantes (1947) .... Abby Jackson
Shadow Valley (1947) .... Mary Ann Jarvis
Where the North Begins (1947, Short) .... Mary Rockwell
Trail of the Mounties (1947) .... Kathie McBain
Tornado Range (1948) .... Mary King
The Hawk of Powder River (1948) .... Vivian Chambers aka The Hawk
Range Renegades (1948) .... Belle Morgan
The Tioga Kid (1948) .... Jenny Morgan
Panhandle Pete and Jennifer (1950, TV Series) .... Co-host (1950–51)
Tales of Wells Fargo (1957–1959, TV Series) .... Ella
Perry Mason (1958, TV Series) .... Christine

References

External links

 
 Jennifer Holt - Cowboy Heroine

American film actresses
Western (genre) film actresses
American television actresses
20th-century American actresses
Actresses from Los Angeles
1920 births
1997 deaths
Deaths from cancer in England